Euphorbia brachyphylla is a species of plant in the family Euphorbiaceae. It is endemic to Madagascar.  Its natural habitat is known to be primarily rocky areas. The main threat to this species is habitat loss.

References

brachyphylla
Endemic flora of Madagascar
Endangered plants
Taxonomy articles created by Polbot